The 2017–18 UCLA Bruins men's basketball team represented the University of California, Los Angeles during the 2017–18 NCAA Division I men's basketball season. The Bruins were led by fifth-year head coach Steve Alford and played their home games at Pauley Pavilion as members in the Pac-12 Conference. They finished the season 21–12, 11–7 in Pac-12 play to finish in a three-way tie for third place.

The Bruins opened their new practice facility, the Mo Ostin Basketball Center.  They defeated Stanford in the quarterfinals of the Pac-12 tournament to advance to the semifinals where they lost to Arizona. They received an at-large bid to the NCAA tournament, where they lost 65–58 in the First Four to St. Bonaventure for the Bonnies' first tournament win in 48 years. It was the first time in UCLA's history that they had been relegated to a First Four play-in game. It was the first time in the school's four tournament appearances under Alford that they did not advance to the Sweet 16.

Previous season

The Bruins finished the 2016–17 season 31–5 overall; and 15–3 in the conference. During the season, UCLA was invited and participated in the Wooden Legacy in Anaheim, California. UCLA defeated Portland, Nebraska, and Texas A&M to earn 1st place. UCLA also defeated Ohio State in the CBS Sports Classic in Paradise, Nevada. In the postseason, UCLA defeated USC but lost to Arizona in the semifinals of the 2017 Pac-12 Conference men's basketball tournament in Paradise, Nevada. The Bruins were invited and participated in the 2017 NCAA Division I men's basketball tournament, where they defeated Kent State and Cincinnati in Sacramento, California but lost to Kentucky in Memphis, Tennessee in the Sweet Sixteen.

Off-season

Departures

2017 recruiting class

Roster

China incident
At the start of the regular season, three of UCLA's players, Jalen Hill, Cody Riley, and LiAngelo Ball, were arrested in China for allegedly shoplifting before their game against Georgia Tech. The arrested players were confined to their hotel for several days until the charges were dropped and the players were allowed to leave the country.

The players involved were suspended indefinitely from the team after their return to campus, with LiAngelo eventually withdrawing from UCLA on December 4, 2017. He would go on to play professionally overseas in Lithuania with his younger brother LaMelo.

On December 22, 2017, UCLA announced that the other two suspended players, Riley and Hill, would remain suspended for the whole season, but would be allowed to rejoin practices and team activities on December 26.

Schedule and results

|-
!colspan=12 style=""| Exhibition

|-
!colspan=12 style=""| Non-conference regular season

|-
!colspan=12 style=";"| 
|-

|-
!colspan=12 style=";"| 

|-
!colspan=9 style=| NCAA tournament
|-

Rankings

*AP does not release post-NCAA Tournament rankings

Honors

Preseason award watchlists

Pac-12 Player of the Week
Aaron Holiday (December 26)
Aaron Holiday (February 19)
Aaron Holiday (March 5)

Postseason awards
Aaron Holiday, Third-team All-American - ''Sporting News
Aaron Holiday, First-team All-Pac-12
Aaron Holiday, Pac-12 All-Defensive Team
Thomas Welsh, Second-team All-Pac-12

References

UCLA Bruins men's basketball seasons
UCLA
UCLA
UCLA Bruins basketball, men
UCLA Bruins basketball, men
UCLA Bruins basketball, men
UCLA Bruins basketball, men